John Edward Jackson (12 November 1805 – 6 March 1891) was an English clergyman of the Church of England, antiquary, and archivist.

Life
Born on 12 November 1805, Jackson was second son of James Jackson, a banker, of Doncaster, by Henrietta Priscilla, second daughter of Freeman Bower; Charles Jackson was a younger brother. He was educated at Charterhouse School, matriculated at Brasenose College, Oxford on 9 April 1823, graduated B.A. with second-class classical honours in 1827, and proceeded to M.A. in 1830.

In 1834 he was ordained curate of Farleigh Hungerford. In 1845 he became rector of Leigh Delamere with Sevington, Wiltshire, and in 1846 vicar of Norton Coleparle in the same county. He was also a rural dean and in 1855 became an honorary canon of Bristol Cathedral.

He was greatly interested in geology, and his collection of fossils was left to the Wiltshire Archaeological and Natural History Society, of which he was a founder member, and became secretary and then editor of its magazine. But he later became more interested in history and topography, which were the subject of most of his published works. The most important of these was The Topographical Collections of John Aubrey (1862), which greatly extended the work on which it was based.

Jackson was a Fellow of the Society of Antiquaries of London. He was librarian to the Marquess of Bath, and arranged and indexed the bulk of the manuscripts at Longleat House. He published a number of these manuscripts. Longleat Papers A.D. 1553-1588 appeared in 1872, and two of his papers have appendices with relevant documents from the Longleat archives: Wulfhall and the Seymours (1874); and Amye Robsart (1877).

Personal life
In 1851, he was living alone with a housekeeper and a housemaid.   In 1861, he was at the Parsonage, Leigh Delamere, with two nephews both aged fifteen, a housekeeper, and a housemaid. 
He died in March 1891, leaving a personal estate valued at £34,505, . His executors were two of his nephews, John Houlton Jackson, a senior clerk in the War Office, and Morton Strode Jackson, a principal clerk in the Inland Revenue Office.

Works

Jackson's published works were:

 The History of Grittleton, co. Wilts, 1843, for the Wilts Topographical Society. 
 
 A Guide to Farleigh-Hungerford, co. Somerset, Taunton, 1853 Third edition 1879. 
 History of the ruined Church of St. Mary Magdalene, Doncaster,  London, 1853. 
 Maud Heath's Causey, Devizes, 1854.
 Murder of Henry Long, Esq., A.D. 1594, Devizes, 1854. 
  Reprinted in 1907, together with a description of Bradford-on-Avon. The house is now known as The Hall, Bradford-on-Avon.
 Leland's Journey Through Wiltshire, AD 1540–42, 1854.
 History and Description of St. George's Church at Doncaster, London, 1855. 
 On the Hungerford Chapels in Salisbury Cathedral, Devizes, 1855. 
 A List of Wiltshire Sheriffs, Devizes, 1856. 
 Ambresbury is now known as Amesbury.
 History of Longleat, Devizes, 1857; 2nd ed., 1868.
 The History of the Parish of Kington St. Michael, co. Wilts, Devizes, 1857. 
 The History of the Priory of Monkton Farley, Wilts, Devizes, 1857. 
 Swindon and its Neighbourhood, Devizes, 1861. 
 Malmesbury, Devizes, 1863. 
 Devizes, Devizes, 1864.

 Wittenham and Rowley are now part of the parish of Wingfield.
Wulfhall and the Seymours. With an appendix of original documents discovered at Longleat. Privately printed, 1874.
 An account of the life and death of Amy Robsart, wife of Robert Dudley, 1st Earl of Leicester.

As editor:

Kingston House, Leland's Journey Through Wiltshire; History of Longleat, History of the Priory of Monkton Farley, On the Hungerford Chapels, Maud Heath's Causey, Murder of Henry Long, Wiltshire Sheriffs and The History of Kington St. Michael were published together in 1854 as Wiltshire Essays.

Notes

Attribution
 

1805 births
1891 deaths
19th-century English Anglican priests
English antiquarians
Fellows of the Society of Antiquaries of London
English archivists
People from Doncaster